Triad Securities Corp. was founded in 1976 as a full-service agency only discount brokerage firm.  Currently, it has its corporate headquarters in the Wall Street area of New York City. Triad’s products and services comprise three categories: prime brokerage, the New Issue Service, and U.S. and international equity and fixed income execution.

About
Triad Securities Corp. was founded as a discount brokerage firm in July 1976 by Richard Schultz. Schultz navigated Triad Securities through the stock market crisis of 1987, as well as the Great Recession of 2008. Schultz, now deceased, had gained substantial experience working in brokerage firms including EF Hutton, Bear Stearns, Weisenberg, Weis Voison & Co., and Muriel Seibert; he was also President of Ladenberg Thalmann prior to founding Triad Securities.

Triad Securities Corp. continues to operate through its Wall Street headquarters at 111 Broadway in New York City. Triad is registered with the U.S. Securities and Exchange Commission (SEC), is a member of FINRA (Financial Industry Regulatory Authority), and a member of SIPC (Securities Investor Protection Corporation).

The current management team of Triad Securities Corp. includes: 
 Kevin Schultz, Chairman
 Larry Goldsmith, President
 Russell Campbell, Chief Operating Officer and Chief Financial Officer
 Kenneth Fisher, Director of Electronic Trading
 John P. Hannigan Jr., Head Sales Trader
 Sheri Rosen, Senior Administrator with Triad IPO Service
 Nil Bhattacharya, Director of Technology
 Douglas Cohen, General Counsel

Prime Brokerage
Triad Securities Corp. has been providing prime brokerage services to its global clients since 1994. Triad employs a team of professional Prime Broker specialists who address clients' US and international clearing, financing, and support needs. The company specializes in providing comprehensive prime brokerage services to smaller hedge funds, family offices and professional trading groups. Triad has prime brokerage clearing experience in more than 50 domestic and international markets.

Trade Execution (U.S. and International)
Triad Securities Corp. offers REDI PLUS, an electronic trading platform, to qualified clients. This platform provides market access for U.S. equities between 4:00 a.m. and 8:00 p.m. (ET) and allows customers to control multiple clearing accounts. Triad Securities also operates a domestic trading desk from 5:30 a.m. to 5:00 p.m. (ET) utilizing an extensive network of algorithms, exchanges, and broker connections.
Customers also have access to a full service international execution desk at an affiliated broker-dealer (Triad Securities Limited) in London, England.

New Issue Service
Triad Securities’ New Issue Service provides clients with detailed information on initial public offerings (IPOs) and secondaries and how they are affected by domestic and international variables within the global trading market. The New Issue Service includes reports, a searchable database (including information dating back to 2000), an instant messaging feature, and direct access to Triad's traders. The service has been distributed globally to hundreds of investors with managed assets as little as $500,000 and as large as $200 billion.

References

External links
 Official website
 WSJ: "9 Deals may Price"
 WSJ: "Deal Strain on Refco News"
 Quoted alongside Morgan Stanley
 WSJ: May 2009
  Barrons: Nov 2009
 WSJ: Apr 2010 "Testy Market"
 Mentioned in the book “The Prince of Silicon Valley” pages 112 and 188.

Financial services companies of the United States